Pala. Karuppiah or  Chinna Karuppiah is an Indian politician, film producer, actor and author. He was a member of Legislative assembly in the 14th Tamil Nadu Legislative Assembly from the Harbour constituency in the Chennai District. He is an actor in Tamil films, starting with Angadi Theru. He is also an author who wrote Pattinathaar Oru Paarvai, Arasiyal Sadhirattangal, Kaalam Kizhittha Kodugal, Kannadhaasan, Kaalathin Velippaadu, Ellaigal Neettha Rama Kaadhai and Karunanidhi Enna Kadavulaa.

On 28 January 2016 Pala was expelled from AIADMK by party general secretary J. Jayalalithaa after being accused of indulging in activities contrary to party ideology and bringing it into disrepute. A day later he resigned from his assembly constituency. His house was attacked by unknown assailants following it. He later met the media and accused the AIADMK government of corruption.

Filmography

Actor

Producer 
Indru Nee Nalai Naan (1983)
Andha Oru Nimidam (1985)
Theertha Karaiyinile (1987)
Poruthathu Pothum (1988)
Vaa Vaa Vasanthamey (1992) (also director)
Naadi Thudikkuthadi (TBA)

References 

Tamil Nadu MLAs 2011–2016
Living people
Politicians from Chennai
Tamil film producers
People from Sivaganga district
1943 births
Male actors in Tamil cinema
Makkal Needhi Maiam politicians
All India Anna Dravida Munnetra Kazhagam politicians
Dravida Munnetra Kazhagam politicians
Marumalarchi Dravida Munnetra Kazhagam politicians